Mulhe is a small settlement in the Sava Hills in the Municipality of Šmartno pri Litiji in central Slovenia. The area is part of the traditional region of Lower Carniola and is now included in the Central Slovenia Statistical Region.

References

External links
Mulhe at Geopedia

Populated places in the Municipality of Šmartno pri Litiji